HJCU (AM 730 kHz)is a radio station in Bogotá, Colombia, part of the Cadena Melodía network. Since its inception, it has been focused on the easy listening genre, with some news on mornings and afternoons on weekdays.

The radio station ceased to broadcast on FM because the owners of the frequency decided to lease it to Grupo Valorem, a Colombian group that owns Caracol Televisión, which created Bluradio. It currently broadcasts its programming on AM 730 and it streams at cadenamelodia.com.

External links 
Melodía FM Estéreo
Live streaming

Radio stations established in 1967
Radio stations in Colombia
Mass media in Bogotá